Ctenochaetus strigosus, known by the common names kole tang or spotted surgeonfish or goldring surgeonfish or yellow-eyed tang, is a marine reef tang in the fish family Acanthuridae which is endemic to Oceania.  It grows to 5.7 inches (14.6 cm) in the wild.  It has a brown color with light blue to yellow horizontal stripes over its body which change into spots towards the face.  It also has a vividly yellow area surrounding the eye. In the aquarium trade it can be seen under a variety of common names, including yellow-eyed kole tang, striped bristletooth, and bristletooth tang.

This species is an herbivore, grazing algae on the shallow reef. It has also been commonly observed to clean algal growths from the shells of sea turtles. In the Ahihi-Kinau nature preserve area on Maui, Hawaii, aggregations of this fish have established "cleaning stations" where green sea turtles come to be groomed. This is a symbiotic relationship. The fish benefit by having access to an easy meal, while the turtles get groomed of the algae growths on their shells, which can increase drag in the water when growth becomes too dense.

The species is commonly offered for sale in the marine aquarium trade, where it is valued for its algae-grazing habit. It can be aggressive toward other surgeonfish and needs high amounts of water movement when kept in captivity, where a minimum of a 70-gallon aquarium is required.

References

External links
 FishBase

Acanthuridae
Fish of Hawaii
Fish described in 1828